The UK Albums Chart is one of many music charts compiled by the Official Charts Company that calculates the best-selling albums of the week in the United Kingdom. Since 2004 the chart has been based on the sales of both physical albums and digital downloads. This list shows albums that peaked in the top 10 of the UK Albums Chart during 2014, as well as albums which peaked in 2013 and 2015 but were in the top 10 in 2014. The entry date is when the album appeared in the top 10 for the first time (week ending, as published by the Official Charts Company, which is six days after the chart is announced).

One-hundred and fifty-eight albums were in the top ten this year. Two albums from 2012 and sixteen albums from 2013 remained in the top 10 for several weeks at the beginning of the year, while Hozier by Hozier was released in 2014 but did not reach its peak until 2015. Beyoncé by Beyoncé was the only album from 2013 to reach its peak in 2014. Halcyon by Ellie Goulding debuted in 2012 and re-entered the top 10 in 2013, but its peak position was not until 2014. Sam Smith and Ella Henderson were among the many artists who achieved their first UK charting top 10 album in 2014.

The first new number-one album of the year was Halcyon by Ellie Goulding. Overall, thirty-two different albums peaked at number-one in 2014, with thirty-two unique artists hitting that position.

Background

Multiple entries
One-hundred and fifty-eight albums charted in the top 10 in 2014, with one-hundred and forty-two albums reaching their peak this year.

Chart debuts
Six artists achieved their first top 10 album in 2014 as a lead artist (correct to 22 March 2014).

The following table (collapsed on desktop site) does not include acts who had previously charted as part of a group and secured their first top 10 solo album, or featured appearances on compilations or other artists recordings.

Best-selling albums
Ed Sheeran had the best-selling album of the year with ×. In the Lonely Hour by Sam Smith came in second place. George Ezra's Wanted on Voyage, Caustic Love from Paolo Nutini and Ghost Stories by Coldplay made up the top five. Albums by Paloma Faith, One Direction, Olly Murs, Pink Floyd and Take That were also in the top ten best-selling albums of the year.

Top-ten albums
Key

Entries by artist
The following table shows artists who achieved two or more top 10 entries in 2014, including albums that reached their peak in 2013. The figures only include main artists, with featured artists and appearances on compilation albums not counted individually for each artist. The total number of weeks an artist spent in the top ten in 2014 is also shown.

Notes

 Hozier reached its peak of number 3 in 2015.
 Christmas (Michael Buble) originally peaked at number-one upon its initial release in 2011. It returned to the top 10 at the end of 2013 around Christmas. 
 Bad Blood re-entered the top 10 at number 6 on 11 January 2014 (week ending) for 5 weeks and at number 10 on 22 February 2014 (week ending) for 5 weeks.
 Night Visions re-entered the top 10 at number 9 on 15 March 2014 (week ending).
 To Be Loved re-entered the top 10 at number 6 on 21 December 2013 (week ending) for 3 weeks.
 Home re-entered the top 10 at number 7 on 11 January 2014 (week ending) for 3 weeks and at number 5 on 1 March 2014 (week ending) for 2 weeks.
 Halcyon re-entered the top 10 at number 10 on 26 July 2014 (week ending) for 2 weeks and at number 7 on 16 August 2014 (week ending).
 Settle re-entered the top 10 at number 3 on 1 March 2014 (week ending) for 3 weeks.
 AM re-entered the top 10 at number 8 on 11 January 2014 (week ending) for 2 weeks, at number 2 on 1 March 2014 (week ending) for 4 weeks and at number 8 on 31 May 2014 (week ending) for 2 weeks.
 If You Wait re-entered the top 10 at number 10 on 18 January 2014 (week ending) for 2 weeks, at number 7 on 8 February 2014 (week ending) for 8 weeks, at number 9 on 19 April 2014 (week ending) and at number 10 on 7 June 2014 (week ending).
 True re-entered the top 10 at number 9 on 11 January 2014 (week ending) for 7 weeks and at number 4 on 15 March 2014 (week ending).
 Tribute re-entered the top 10 at number 5 on 11 January 2014 (week ending) for 3 weeks and at number 10 on 1 March 2014 (week ending).
 Prism re-entered the top 10 at number 7 on 15 March 2014 (week ending).
 Moon Landing re-entered the top 10 at number 8 on 1 February 2014 (week ending) and at number 6 on 22 February 2014 (week ending).
 Pure Heroine re-entered the top 10 at number 8 on 8 February 2014 (week ending) for 2 weeks, at number 9 on 1 March 2014 (week ending) for 2 weeks and at number 8 on 22 February 2014 (week ending).
 The Marshall Mathers LP 2 re-entered the top 10 at number 7 on 4 January 2014 (week ending) and at number 10 on 8 February 2014 (week ending).
 Since I Saw You Last re-entered the top 10 at number 9 on 22 February 2014 (week ending), at number 10 on 5 April 2014 (week ending) and at number 2 on 17 May 2014 (week ending) for 2 weeks.
 Girl re-entered the top 10 at number 10 on 31 May 2014 (week ending) for 2 weeks.
 The Take Off and Landing of Everything re-entered the top 10 at number 7 on 26 April 2014 (week ending) for 3 weeks.
 A Perfect Contradiction re-entered the top 10 at number 10 on 2 August 2014 (week ending), at number 6 on 16 August 2014 (week ending) for 4 weeks, at number 9 on 3 January 2015 (week ending) for 4 weeks, at number 8 on 7 March 2015 (week ending) for 3 weeks and at number 10 on 18 April 2015 (week ending).
 Love in the Future re-entered the top 10 at number 6 on 15 November 2014 (week ending).
 Going Back Home re-entered the top 10 at number 9 on 24 May 2014 (week ending).
 Lift Your Spirit re-entered the top 10 at number 10 on 17 May 2014 (week ending).
 Meet the Vamps re-entered the top 10 at number 9 on 7 June 2014 (week ending).
 In the Lonely Hour re-entered the top 10 at number 10 on 8 October 2015 (week ending) for 7 weeks.
 + originally peaked at number-one upon its initial release in 2011.
 Wanted on Voyage re-entered the top 10 at number 10 on 23 July 2015 (week ending) for 2 weeks. 
 Nothing but the Beat originally peaked at number two upon its initial release in 2011.
 Royal Blood re-entered the top 10 at number 3 on 7 March 2015 (week ending) for 3 weeks.
 The Whole Story originally peaked at number 2 upon its initial release in 1986, rising to number-one in 1987.
 Hounds of Love originally peaked at number-one upon its initial release in 1985.
 Legend originally peaked at number-one upon its initial release in 1984.
 No Sound Without Silence re-entered the top 10 at number 9 on 15 November 2014 (week ending) and at number 10 on 10 January 2015 (week ending).
 Partners re-entered the top 10 at number 9 on 27 December 2014 (week ending).
 Hozier re-entered the top 10 at number 10 on 17 January 2015 (week ending) for 8 weeks, at number 6 on 16 May 2015 (week ending) for 4 weeks, at number 8 on 9 July 2015 (week ending) and at number 9 on 30 July 2015 (week ending).
 Chapter One re-entered the top 10 at number 8 on 3 January 2015 (week ending) for 4 weeks.
 1989 re-entered the top 10 at number 4 on 4 July 2015 (week ending) for 9 weeks and at number 8 on 7 January 2016 (week ending).
 Motion re-entered the top 10 at number 8 on 10 January 2015 (week ending).
 Never Been Better re-entered the top 10 at number 9 on 3 December 2015 (week ending) and at number 10 on 31 December 2015 (week ending).
 Figure includes album that peaked in 2013.

See also
2014 in British music
List of number-one albums from the 2000s (UK)

References
General

Specific

External links
2014 album chart archive at the Official Charts Company (click on relevant week)

United Kingdom top 10 albums
Top 10 albums
2014